The 2019 Best of Nollywood Awards was the 11th edition of the ceremony and took place in the Coronation Hall of the Kano State Government in Kano State on 14 December 2019. Dr. Abdullahi Umar Ganduje was the chief host of the event and the event was co-hosted by actress, Maryam Booth and Gbenga Adeyinka.

About 100 films were considered. The nomination list was revealed by the jury on 29 September 2019 where Gold Statue by Tade Ogidan earned the highest nominations with 12 nominations followed by Diamonds In The Sky by Femi Adebayo with 11 nominations. 

Veteran actor, Sadiq Daba was awarded the Lifetime Achievement Award which was presented by the Kano State governor, Ganduje. Governor Ganduje also endowed Sadiq Daba with a ₦1 million donation on behalf of the Kano the State Government.

Gold Statue won in 6 categories including movie of the year, best actor of the year, director of the year, movie with the best production design, film with the best use of sound and best use of make-up in a Movie. Diamonds In The Sky won in 2 categories namely;  movie with the best editing and movie with the best cinematography.

Other winners include Tamara Etaimo, Ibrahim Yekini, Adebimpe Oyebade, Abba Elmustapha, Hadiza Gabon, Hassana Muhammad and Hauwa Kulu.

It was noted that Igbo language films were not represented in the awards and the head of Jury of BON awards, Niran Adedokun reacted saying "The process started in July and with over 100 movies entered for nomination consideration. BON is interested in the promotion of films in Nigerian languages as filmmaking is a tool for preservation. But we struggle to get entries in other languages other than Yoruba so I encourage producers to employ more of our languages and sunlit them for awards."

Awards

See also 

 List of African film awards

References

External links 
 

2019
2019 awards
2019 in Nigerian cinema